The Irani Trophy in 2005-06 saw the Rest of India take on the winners of last year's Ranji Trophy, Railways, at Delhi from 1 October to 5 October. It is a traditional season opener. The Trophy was won by Railways.

Railways v Rest of India (1–5 October)
Railways won by 9 wickets

2005–06 Indian cricket season
Irani Cup